Chlorion aerarium, commonly known as the steel-blue cricket hunter, is a species of thread-waisted wasps in the family Sphecidae.

 It is similar in shape and colour to the blue mud dauber species, Chalybion californicum, which often overlaps in range.

References

Further reading

 NCBI Taxonomy Browser, Chlorion aerarium
 

Sphecidae
Insects described in 1879